Phanera saigonensis is a species of lianas in the subfamily Cercidoideae and the tribe Bauhinieae, the genus having been separated from Bauhinia.  Under its synonym Bauhinia saïgonensis, records exist from the tropical forests Indochina only.

Accepted infraspecifics
Plants of the World Online lists:
 P. saigonensis var. gagnepainiana  (K.Larsen & S.S.Larsen) Mackinder & R.Clark (not Vietnam)
 P. saigonensis var. poilanei  (K.Larsen & S.S.Larsen) Mackinder & R.Clark (Vietnam only)
 P. saigonensis var. saigonensis (Vietnam only)

References

External Links

Cercidoideae
Flora of Indo-China
Fabales of Asia